The 1933 College Football All-America team is composed of college football players who were selected as All-Americans by various organizations and writers that chose College Football All-America Teams in 1933. The eight selectors recognized by the NCAA as "official" for the 1933 season are (1) the All-America Board, (2) the Associated Press (AP), (3) Collier's Weekly, as selected by Grantland Rice, (4) the International News Service (INS), (5) Liberty magazine, (6) the Newspaper Enterprise Association (NEA), (7) the North American Newspaper Alliance (NANA), and the United Press (UP).  The only unanimous selections were center Chuck Bernard of Michigan and quarterback Cotton Warburton of USC.

Consensus All-Americans
For the year 1933, the NCAA recognizes eight published All-American teams as "official" designations for purposes of its consensus determinations. The following chart identifies the NCAA-recognized consensus All-Americans and displays which first-team designations they received.

All-American selections for 1933

Ends
Joe Skladany, Pittsburgh (College Football Hall of Fame) (AAB; AP-1; CO-1; FWAA; INS-1; LIB; NANA-1; NEA-1; UP-3; CNS; CP-1; DJW-1; NYS-1; WC-1; WD-1)
Paul Geisler, Centenary (AP-1; CO-2; INS-2; UP-1; CP-3; WD-1)
Bill Smith, Washington (AAB; AP-2; CO-3; INS-3; LIB; NANA-1; NEA-2; UP-2; MP-1; WC-1; WD-2)
Ted Petoskey, Michigan (AP-2; CO-2; INS-1; NANA-2; UP-2; CP-1; MP-1)
Frank Larson, Minnesota (CO-1; INS-2; NANA-2; NEA-1; CNS; NYS-1; WD-2)
Edgar Manske, Northwestern (UP-1)
Red Matal, Columbia (CO-3; FWAA; INS-3; CP-2; DJW-1)
Jim Moscrip, Stanford (College Football Hall of Fame) (NANA-3; NEA-3; CP-2)
Hugh Devore, Notre Dame (AP-3)
Lester Borden, Fordham (AP-3)
Fred Conrinus, St. Mary's (UP-3)
Peter James Kopcsak, Army (CP-3)
Clary Anderson, Colgate (NANA-3)

Tackles
Francis Wistert, Michigan (College Football Hall of Fame) (AAB; CO-1; FWAA; INS-2; NANA-2; UP-1; CNS; CP-2; DJW-1; NYS-1; WC-1)
Fred Crawford, Duke (College Football Hall of Fame) (AP-1; CO-1; INS-1; LIB; NANA-1; UP-1;  CNS; CP-1; MP-1; WD-1)
Charles Ceppi, Princeton (AAB; AP-2; CO-3; FWAA; INS-1; LIB; NANA-1; NEA-2; UP-2; CP-1; DJW-1; WC-1; WD-2)
Adolphe Schwammel, Oregon State (AP-1; INS-3; UP-3 [g]; MP-1)
John Yezerski, St. Mary's (NEA-1)
Charles Harvey, Holy Cross (AP-2; INS-2; UP-3; CP-2)
Bud Jorgensen, St. Mary's (CO-2; INS-3; UP-2; NYS-1; WD-2)
Art Buss, Michigan State (AP-3; CO-3; NEA-2)
Cassius Gentry, Oklahoma (AP-3)
Frank Walton, Pittsburgh (UP-3; NANA-3)
Gail O'Brien, Nebraska (CP-3)
George T. Barclay, North Carolina (AP-3 [g]; CP-3)
Peter Mehringer, Kansas (CO-2)
Lane, Princeton (NANA-2)
Ted Rosequist, Ohio State (NANA-3)

Guards
Bill Corbus, Stanford (College Football Hall of Fame) (AAB; AP-1; CO-1; FWAA; INS-1; LIB; NANA-1; NEA-1; UP-2; CNS; CP-1; DJW-1; NYS-1; WC-1; WD-1)
Aaron Rosenberg, USC (College Football Hall of Fame) (AAB; AP-2; CO-1; INS-1; NANA-2; NEA-1; UP-1; CNS; CP-3; MP-1; NYS-1; WC-1; WD-1)
Zud Schammel, Iowa (AP-1; CO-2; LIB; NANA-1; INS-2; UP-1; CP-2; WD-2)
Thomas Hupke, Alabama (AP-2; CO-3; INS-3; NANA-3; NEA-2; UP-2; CP-1; WD-2)
Larry Stevens, USC (FWAA; INS-3; DJW-1)
Harvey Jablonsky, Army (AP-3; UP-3; NANA-3; NEA-2; INS-2; CP-2)
Bill Volok, Tulsa (CO-2)
Joseph Gailus, Ohio State (CO-3; NANA-2; MP-1)
Bunny Burzio, Carnegie Tech (CP-3)

Centers
Chuck Bernard, Michigan (AAB; AP-1; CO-1; FWAA; INS-1; LIB; NANA-1; NEA-1; UP-1; CNS; CP-1; DJW-1; MP-1; NYS-1; WC-1; WD-1)
Johnny Dell Isola, Fordham (UP-3; CO-2; NANA-2; INS-2; CP-2; WD-2)
Lee Coats, UCLA (AP-2; NEA-2)
Roy Oen, Minnesota (UP-2; INS-3)
Larry Siemering, San Francisco (AP-3)
Tal Maples, Tennessee (CP-3)
Mike Vuchinich, Ohio State (CO-3)
Howard Christie, California (NANA-3)

Quarterbacks
Cotton Warburton, USC (College Football Hall of Fame) (AAB; AP-1; CO-1; FWAA; INS-1; LIB; NANA-1; NEA-1; UP-1; CNS; CP-1; DJW-1; MP-1; NYS-1; WC-1; WD-1)
Cliff Montgomery, Columbia (AP-3; UP-2; INS-2; CP-3)
Joe Laws, Iowa (CO-2; NANA-2; INS-3; DW-2)
Paul Johnson, Army (AP-2; NEA-2)
Manning Smith, Centenary (UP-3)
Deke Brackett, Tennessee (CP-2)
Bobby Grayson, Stanford (CO-3; NANA-2 [fb])

Halfbacks
Beattie Feathers, Tennessee (College Football Hall of Fame) (AAB; AP-2; CO-1; FWAA; INS-1; LIB; NANA-1; NEA-1; UP-2; CNS; CP-1; DJW-1; NYS-1; WC-1; WD-1)
George Sauer, Nebraska (College Football Hall of Fame) (AAB; AP-1; CO-1; FWAA; INS-1; LIB; NANA-1 [fb]; NEA-1; CNS [fb]; CP-2; DJW-1; MP-1; WC-1; WD-1)
Jack Buckler, Army (AP-1; CO-2; INS-2; NANA-2; NEA-1; UP-1; CNS; CP-1; MP-1; NYS-1; WD-2)
Pug Lund, Minnesota (AP-1; CO-2; FWAA; INS-1; NANA-2; UP-2 [fb]; CP-1 [fb]; DJW-1; MP-1; WD-2 [fb])
Norman Franklin, Oregon State (AP-3; CO-3; INS-3; NEA-2; UP-1; WD-2)
Herman Everhardus, Michigan (COL-3; INS-2; NANA-3 [qb]; NEA-2)
Ed Danowski, Fordham (CO-2 [fb]; INS-2 [fb]; NANA-3; UP-3)
Doug Nott, Detroit (UP-2; CP-3)
George Wilson, St. Mary's (AP-3; UP-3; CP-2)
Dixie Howell, Alabama (CP-3)
Garrett LeVan, Princeton (NANA-3)

Fullbacks
Duane Purvis, Purdue (AAB; AP-2 [hb]; CO-1 [hb]; INS-3 [hb]; LIB; NANA-1 [hb]; UP-1; CP-2 [hb]; WC-1; WD-1 [hb])
Mike Mikulak, Oregon (AP-2; CO-3; INS-3; NANA-3; UP-3; NYS-1)
Ralph Graham, Kansas State (NEA-2)
Ralph Kercheval, Kentucky (AP-3; CP-3)

Key
 Bold – Consensus All-American
 -1 – First-team selection
 -2 – Second-team selection
 -3 – Third-team selection

NCAA recognized "official" selectors
 AAB = All-America Board
 AP = Associated Press
 CO = Collier's Weekly, selected by Grantland Rice
 INS = Hearst Consensus All-American Selections, selected through an all-season survey of 210 of the country's coaches, sports writers, football officials and observers for the International News Service
 LIB = Liberty magazine
 NANA = North American Newspaper Alliance
 NEA = Newspaper Enterprise Association, selected by the NEA All-American Committee of coaches, including Jock Sutherland (Pitt), Noble Kizer (Purdue), Harry Mehre (Georgia), Bill Spaulding (UCLA), Ike Armstrong (Utah), Bo McMillin (Kansas State), and Fred Thomsen (Arkansas)
 UP = United Press

Other selectors
 CP = Central Press Association, as picked by football team captains
 NYS = New York Sun
 WC = Walter Camp Football Foundation
 DJW = Davis J. Walsh, sports editor of International News Service
 FWAA = Football Writers Association of American
 WD = Walter Dobbins, a consensus based on the selections of Collier's, the United Press, the Associated Press, the All America Board, the New York Sun, the North America Newspaper Alliance, and Hearst
 MP = Midweek Pictorial
 CNS = Consensus team based on combined selections of the United Press, Associated Press, NEA News Service and the Collier's Weekly team by Grantland Rice

See also
 1933 All-Big Six Conference football team
 1933 All-Big Ten Conference football team
 1933 All-Pacific Coast Conference football team
 1933 All-SEC football team
 1933 All-Southwest Conference football team

References

All-America Team
College Football All-America Teams